Events in the year 2020 in Austria.

Incumbents

 President: Alexander Van der Bellen
 Chancellor: Brigitte Bierlein (until 7 January); Sebastian Kurz (from 7 January)

Governors
 Burgenland: Hans Peter Doskozil
 Carinthia: Peter Kaiser
 Lower Austria: Johanna Mikl-Leitner
 Salzburg: Wilfried Haslauer Jr.
 Styria: Hermann Schützenhöfer
 Tyrol: Günther Platter
 Upper Austria: Thomas Stelzer
 Vienna: Michael Ludwig
 Vorarlberg: Markus Wallner

Events
7 January – Sebastian Kurz takes over as Chancellor of Austria, replacing Brigitte Bierlein

9 – 26 January – The 2020 European Men's Handball Championship is hosted by Austria, Norway and Sweden.
20 – 26 January – The 2020 European Figure Skating Championships is held in Graz.

Deaths

January
3 January – Wolfgang Brezinka, educational scientist (b. 1928).
17 January – Oswald Oberhuber, sculptor and painter (b. 1931).
19 January – Manfred Clynes, Austrian-born Australian-American scientist, inventor and musician (b. 1925).
21 January – Theodor Wagner, footballer (b. 1927).
23 January 
Adolf Holl, theologian (b. 1930).
Alfred Körner, footballer (b. 1926).
Franz Mazura, operatic bass-baritone (b. 1924).

February
7 February – Paul Koralek, Austrian-born British architect (b. 1933).
15 February – Wilfried Thaler, cyclist (b. 1934).

August
24 August – Frederick Baker, filmmaker and archaeologist (b. 1965).

References

 
2020s in Austria
Years of the 21st century in Austria
Austria
Austria